Chapar is a town under the Dhubri district in the state of Assam. It has an average elevation of 22 metres (72 feet). Like the rest of Assam, Chapar frequently has problems with flooding. The town is situated on the bank of the Champabati River.  

National Highway 31 passes through Chapar.

Demographics
As of the 2001 Indian census, Chapar had a population of 18,559. Males constitute 52% of the population and females 48%. Chapar has an average literacy rate of 65%, higher than the national average of 59.5%, with male literacy of 71% and female literacy of 58%. 14% of the population is under six years of age.

References

Cities and towns in Dhubri district
Dhubri